Vaughan is an unincorporated community in southern Hill County in Central Texas. It is located approximately eight miles south of Hillsboro, at the intersection of Farm Roads 1947 and 310, and roughly half a mile from Aquilla Lake.

History 
The first anglo settlement, named Willow, was located two miles to the east. The community included a church and a school. Vaughan was likely named after a local resident in the 1880s, Dr. B. H. Vaughan. A post office was established in 1885, and a population of twenty-five was recorded in 1890. The community also featured a general store, a wagonmaker and a physician at this time. A cotton gin was constructed in 1898 and a Baptist Church was built around 1900. A methodist church was also founded around this time. By 1915 the Vaughan and Willow schools had been consolidated. By the 1930s, the population was fifty. The population remained steady until the 1960s. A tornado killed seven people in Vaughan in 1959 with a number of buildings, including its churches being destroyed.

By the 1970s, the population had increased to seventy, however by the 1980s, the Baptist church was the only institution still in operation. In 2010, the population was seventy-five.

References 

Unincorporated communities in Hill County, Texas
Unincorporated communities in Texas